"Clown Prince" is a 2006 song by Australian band Hilltop Hoods. 

Clown Prince may also refer to:

Clown Princes, a 1939 Our Gang short comedy film
Victor Borge, (born 1909-2000), Danish-American comedian, conductor and pianist nicknamed the "Clown Prince of Denmark"
Biz Markie (born 1964–2021), American rapper nicknamed the "Clown Prince of Hip Hop"
Chad Morgan (born 1933), Australian country musician nicknamed the "Clown Prince of Comedy", or of Australian country music
Jack L. Warner (1892–1978), American film executive nicknamed the "Clown Prince of Hollywood"
Len Shackleton (1922–2000), English footballer nicknamed the "Clown Prince of Soccer", or of football
Max Patkin (1920–1999), American baseball player nicknamed the "Clown Prince of Baseball"
Shane Gillis (1987-), American standup comedian nicknamed "Clown Prince of the Alt-Right"
Eddie Sachs (1927–1964), American racing driver nicknamed the "Clown Prince of Auto Racing"
Joker (character), a fictional supervillain nicknamed the "Clown Prince of Crime"

See also
Clown Prince of the Menthol Trailer, a 1994 EP by Guided by Voices
Clown
Prince
Crown prince